Jason Thornberry (born 1971) is an American writer and musician. His tenure with the Southern California alternative-punk group Mulch saw them perform 200 times in two years, a feat for an unsigned band. Mulch performed with everyone from No Doubt to NOFX in the early 1990s. Thornberry founded The Pressure, who went from complete obscurity to the cover of OC Weekly less than a year after their first concert. In 1999, The Pressure was readying the release of their debut album Things Move Fast, when Thornberry was discovered in a coma after being beaten nearly to death. Four months later, he was released in a wheelchair. Within a year he was walking again, and Thornberry had begun to document the experience. He continued to see therapists, having also temporarily lost the ability to speak, or to use the left side of his body, as a result of the assault.

He returned to school and edited his college newspaper, The Coast Report, along with contributions to The OC Weekly, URB, Mean Street, and more than two dozen print and online music magazines around the world.

Thornberry holds a B.A. from Seattle Pacific University and an M.F.A. from Chapman University.

Discography
(This list includes musical artists with whom Thornberry appeared.)

Mulch
Nowhere to Climb (1994).
13 Dayz (1995).
Aces and Spaces (2008).
Organic Recordings from Wrightwood's Mulch  (2015)

The Pressure
My Heart Was Lost (1996).
The Pressure (1997).
I Wanna Call Someone (1998).
v/a Brother Can You Spare Some Ska Vol. 4 (1998).
v/a Al's Bar Compilation, Vol. 2 (1998).
v/a Styzine Compilation (1998).
v/a The Buddy List (1999).
Things Move Fast (1999).
v/a Orange County Weekly compilation'’ (1999).
v/a Sampler WE 20.0'’ (year?).

Bibliography
Newspapers:
 Coast Report
 Orange County Weekly
 The Stranger

Magazines:
 American Music Press
 The Blacklist
 Capable Magazine
 Central Circuit
 Flipside
 Litro Magazine
 Mean Street
 Mic Stand Magazine
 Response
 Resurrection Magazine
 Skratch
 Sleet
 Uncomfortable Revolution
 URB

Journals:
 Adirondack Review
 ALAN Review
 Antonym
 Bookends Review
 Broadkill Review
 Dillydoun Review
 Entropy
 Harbor Review
 Hash Journal
 Helix Literary & Art Magazine
 In Parentheses Literary Magazine 
 JMWW Journal
 Letters Journal
 Litro Magazine
 Los Angeles Review of Books
 North Dakota Quarterly
 Olivetree Review
 Open: Journal of Arts & Letters 
 Phantom Kangaroo
 Poet’s Choice 
 Poor Yorick Literary Magazine
 Praxis Magazine for Arts and Literature
 Response
 Route 7 Review
 Sledgehammer Literary Journal
 Soundings East
 TAB: The Journal of Poetry & Poetics
 Thimble Literary Magazine

Online:
 Alternative Zine (Israel)
 Americore
 AMZ Music Zine
 Aversion
 Beat The Blizzard (UK)
 Bendies
 Bite Me!
 Blistering (Canada)
 Buzzine
 California Pop
 CanEHdian (Canada)
 Chaos Control Digizine
 Chaotic Critiques
 Cosmik Debris
 Crud (UK)
 Daily Vault
 Dissident Voice
 Geek America
 Gepetto
 Global Hip Hop
 Hybrid Magazine
 Inkblot
 Legion (Russia)
 Maelstrom
 Mavis's Dream
 Metal Crypt
 Metal UK (UK)
 Mic Stand Online
 Misfit City (UK)
 Open Up & Say
 Pandomag
 Punk News
 Rockezine
 60 Seconds
 Sweet Tea (UK)
 2Walls
 Vivid Hues

References

External links
 The Absolution of Jack Ruby
 Air Escaping
 Eyes That Catch the Light
 Bad Brains Embrace P.M.A.
 The Cashmere Cloak
 The Clever Fool
 Coffins of Styrofoam
 Censored Young Adult Sports Novels: Entry Points for Understanding Issues of Identities and Equity (w/ Kristine Gritter and James E. Fredriksen)
 Eastsound
 Forwarding Address
 The Further Adventures of King Gizzard & The Lizard Wizard
 Junior Murvin's Vision of Police Brutality
 Maladroit
 Misty
 A River Runs Through It
 Seattle Landlords Are the Weirdest People
 Security Blanket 
  Solace in Dub
 SPU Hosts Special Olympics
 What Does a Coma Feel Like?
The Pressure | Listen and Stream Free Music, Albums, New Releases, Photos, Videos
What Else? Records
Elastic Records
MULCH (1994 - 1996) | Listen and Stream Free Music, Albums, New Releases, Photos, Videos
MULCH | Listen and Stream Free Music, Albums, New Releases, Photos, Videos
Zad | Listen and Stream Free Music, Albums, New Releases, Photos, Videos

1971 births
Living people
American indie rock musicians
American punk rock drummers
American male drummers
American magazine writers
American newspaper writers
Mod revival
Musicians from California
20th-century American drummers
21st-century American drummers
20th-century American male musicians
21st-century American male musicians